Boulder was an American rock band, formed in Cleveland, Ohio, in 1992. Members of the group had previously played in hardcore punk bands and were heavily influenced by the new wave of British heavy metal. Before releasing their debut album, The Rage of It All, they had toured in several clubs in Ohio. The group's bassist, Jamie Walters, would later play for Destructor and Midnight.

Heavy metal journalist, Ian Christe, described the group as follows:

Discography
 The Rage of It All (1999)
 Ravage and Savage (2000)
 Ripping Christ (2001)
 Reaped in Half (2002)

Notes

References
Christe, Ian (2003). Sound of the Beast: The Complete Headbanging History of Heavy Metal. HarperCollins. 

American hard rock musical groups
Musical groups established in 1992
Heavy metal musical groups from Ohio
Musical groups from Cleveland
1992 establishments in Ohio